Klickitat County is a county located in the U.S. state of Washington. As of the 2020 census, the population was 22,735. The county seat and largest city is Goldendale. The county is named after the Klickitat tribe.

History

Klickitat County was created out of Walla Walla County on December 20, 1859.  Samuel Hill was an early promoter of the area, promoting better roads and building local landmarks such as a war memorial replica of Stonehenge (Maryhill Stonehenge) and a mansion that would become the Maryhill Museum of Art. The Sam Hill Memorial Bridge across the Columbia River is named after him.

Geography

Geographic features
Cascade Mountains
Columbia River

Major highways
 U.S. Route 97
 State Route 14
 State Route 141
 State Route 142

Adjacent counties

Yakima County - north
Benton County - northeast
Morrow County, Oregon - southeast
Gilliam County, Oregon - southeast
Sherman County, Oregon - south
Hood River County, Oregon - southwest
Wasco County, Oregon - southwest
Skamania County - west

National protected areas
Conboy Lake National Wildlife Refuge
Gifford Pinchot National Forest (part)

Demographics

2000 census
As of the census of 2000, there were 19,161 people, 7,473 households, and 5,305 families living in the county.  The population density was 10 people per square mile (4/km2).  There were 8,633 housing units at an average density of 5 per square mile (2/km2).  The racial makeup of the county was 87.56% White, 0.27% Black or African American, 3.47% Native American, 0.73% Asian, 0.21% Pacific Islander, 5.02% from other races, and 2.75% from two or more races.  7.81% of the population were Hispanics or Latinos of any race. 17.7% were of German, 14.0% United States or American, 11.1% English and 9.6% Irish ancestry. 90.3% spoke English and 7.8% Spanish as their first language.

There were 7,473 households, out of which 32.30% had children under the age of 18 living with them, 57.70% were married couples living together, 9.10% had a female householder with no husband present, and 29.00% were non-families. 23.80% of all households were made up of individuals, and 9.00% had someone living alone who was 65 years of age or older.  The average household size was 2.54 and the average family size was 2.99.

The age distribution was 27.10% under the age of 18, 6.50% from 18 to 24, 25.70% from 25 to 44, 27.00% from 45 to 64, and 13.80% who were 65 years of age or older.  The median age was 40 years. For every 100 females there were 99.50 males.  For every 100 females age 18 and over, there were 98.80 males.

The median income for a household in the county was $34,267, and the median income for a family was $40,414. Males had a median income of $36,067 versus $21,922 for females. The per capita income for the county was $16,502.  About 12.60% of families and 17.00% of the population were below the poverty line, including 22.50% of those under age 18 and 15.10% of those age 65 or over.

2010 census
As of the 2010 census, there were 20,318 people, 8,327 households, and 5,626 families living in the county. The racial makeup of the county was 87.7% white, 2.4% American Indian, 0.6% Asian, 0.2% black or African American, 0.1% Pacific islander, 5.6% from other races, and 3.3% from two or more races. Those of Hispanic or Latino origin made up 10.7% of the population. In terms of ancestry,

Of the 8,327 households, 27.6% had children under the age of 18 living with them, 54.5% were married couples living together, 8.5% had a female householder with no husband present, 32.4% were non-families, and 26.4% of all households were made up of individuals. The average household size was 2.42 and the average family size was 2.88. The median age was 45.3 years.

The median income for a household in the county was $37,398 and the median income for a family was $46,012. Males had a median income of $43,588 versus $31,114 for females. The per capita income for the county was $21,553. About 13.7% of families and 19.5% of the population were below the poverty line, including 33.9% of those under age 18 and 9.4% of those age 65 or over.

Communities

Cities
Bingen
Goldendale (county seat)
White Salmon

Census-designated places

Bickleton
Centerville
Dallesport
Glenwood
Klickitat
Lyle
Maryhill
Roosevelt
Trout Lake
Wishram

Unincorporated communities
Appleton
BZ Corner
Husum
Wahkiacus
High Prairie

Government and politics
Klickitat is located in Washington's 4th congressional district, which has a Cook Partisan Voting Index of R+11 and has been represented by Republican Dan Newhouse since 2023. In state government the county is part of the fourteenth district and is represented by representative Gina Mosbrucker (R) and Chris Corry (R) in the Washington House of Representatives and Curtis King (R) in the Washington State Senate.

In Presidential elections Klickitat is something of a swing county. In 1988 Michael Dukakis narrowly won the county with 49.15% of the vote. Richard Nixon (1960, 1972), Ronald Reagan, Bill Clinton, and George W. Bush all won the county twice. In 2008 Democrat Barack Obama won Klickitat County over Republican John McCain by only 21 votes or percentage wise 48.85% to 48.64%. In 2012 Republican candidate Mitt Romney won the county by a greater margin than in the previous election, with 51.74% of the vote compared to President Obama's 44.75%, and Donald Trump doubled Romney's margin in 2016.

See also
National Register of Historic Places listings in Klickitat County, Washington

Notes

References

External links

Official County website
Klickitat County, Washington at HistoryLink.org

 
1859 establishments in Washington Territory
Populated places established in 1859
Columbia River Gorge
Eastern Washington
Washington placenames of Native American origin